Eric Beach (born 1947), is a New Zealand and Australian poet, playwright, and short story writer.

Born in New Zealand, Beach has lived in Tasmania and in Victoria since 1972.  He is active in the Australian Performance Poetry scene, performing at workshops, readings and events around Australia.

His publication Weeping for Lost Babylon won the 1996 Dinny O'Hearn Poetry Prize, and was joint winner of the Kenneth Slessor Prize for Poetry.

He now resides in Minyip, Victoria in Australia.

Publications
 Weeping for Lost Babylon (Harper Collins, 1996)
 Red Heart My Country (Pardalote Press, 2000)
 Saint Kilda Meets Hugo Ball (Gargoyles Press, 1974)
 In Occupied Territory (The Saturday Centre, 1977)
 A Photo of Some People in a Football Stadium (Overland, 1978)
 Hey Hey Brass Buttons (1990)

References

Australian poets
New Zealand poets
New Zealand male writers
Australian male poets
1947 births
Living people
New Zealand emigrants to Australia